Adrian Antonsen (born October 13, 2004) is a Norwegian film director, film producer and screenwriter.

Antonsen is the owner of the production company  Stubbo Studio which was founded in 2018. With his new production company, he began a solo journey creating his first short film with a cinema release named Escorted. In October 2022, Escorted had it's Norwegian premiere at Vega Scene in Oslo, marking him as one of Norway's youngest film directors. Antonsen has received several international awards for his short film Escorted, and has won and been nominated for awards such as best young filmmaker, best production design and best young director.

Growing up 
Adrian Antonsen grew up in Oppegård, Norway. His interest in film came at an early age, and his first short film was created when he was 7 years old. After that his desire for creating films has grown. Antonsen's production company Stubbo Studio was founded in 2018, and is named after his old family name.

Filmography

Short films 

 2022 Escorted
 2023 Metamorfose

Awards and nominations

References

External links 
 

2004 births
Norwegian film directors
Living people